Emil Kunze (18 December 1901 in Dresden - 13 January 1994) was a German classical archaeologist. The director of the German Archaeological Institute, he resumed excavations at Olympia, Greece after the Second World War.

1901 births
1994 deaths
German classical scholars
Archaeologists from Dresden
Commanders Crosses of the Order of Merit of the Federal Republic of Germany
Corresponding Fellows of the British Academy